Hotel Babylon may refer to:

Television 
 Hotel Babylon (BBC series), a 2000s BBC drama series
 Hotel Babylon (music programme), a 1990s ITV late night music programme

Literature 
 Hotel Babylon (novel), a novel by Imogen Edwards-Jones
 The Grand Babylon Hotel, a novel by Arnold Bennett